Wrestling is an Universiade optional sport since the 1973 in Moscow, USSR. After this, wrestling was optional sport at 1977, 1981, 2005 and 2013 editions. Currently, two styles are competed: freestyle and Greco-Roman. At the 2013 edition, belt wrestling was also part of the program.

Editions

Medal table 
Last updated after the 2013 Summer Universiade

Current events

Men´s Greco-Roman and Freestyle 
 55 kg
 60 kg
 66 kg
 84 kg
 96 kg
 120 kg

Women 
 48 kg
 51 kg
 55 kg
 59 kg
 63 kg
 67 kg
 72 kg

References 
Sports123

 
Sports at the Summer Universiade
Universiade